This is an ongoing bibliography of work related to the Italian baroque painter Artemisia Gentileschi.

2021

2020

2019

2018

2017

2015

2014

2013

2011

2010

2006

2004

2002

2001

2000

1999

1998

1994

1993

1989

1982

1980

1968

1963 

 

Visual arts bibliographies
Artemisia Gentileschi